Kernstown is an unincorporated community within the independent city of Winchester, Virginia. Parts of Kernstown also lie within Frederick County. It is centered along the Valley Pike U.S. Route 11. During the American Civil War, the first and second Battles of Kernstown were fought here.

Adam Kern Sr. (1742-1799) was of German origin, and migrated from York County, Pennsylvania to Frederick County in 1765.  He settled three miles south of Winchester along the Great Wagon Road.   The town of Kernstown was named for his son, Adam Kern Jr. (1773-1855).

Previous names include:
Opequon - at the intersection of the "Great Wagon Road" – now Hwy 11 – and Opequon Creek
Hogue's Tavern – named after a  tavern located at the  intersection of the "Great Wagon Road" – now Hwy 11 – and Opequon Creek
Kernsville – Settlement on Adam Kern Sr.'s land (his brother Michael Kern (1744-1814) purchased 33 acres in 1766 and 36 acres in 1767 and sold all to Adam Kern Sr. in 1773) along the  "Great Wagon Road" – now Hwy 11 – south of Winchester near Opequon Creek
Kernstown – Town was officially established by an act of the Virginia Assembly in 1799.  Town was named after Adam Kern Jr., son of Adam Kern Sr.

See also 
Battle of Kernstown I
Battle of Kernstown II

References

Unincorporated communities in Frederick County, Virginia
Geography of Winchester, Virginia
Unincorporated communities in Virginia